Vieta may refer to:

Artūras Vieta (born 1961), Lithuanian sprint canoer
Eduard Vieta, a Spanish psychiatrist
François Viète, commonly known by the Latin form of his name Franciscus Vieta, a French mathematician,
Vieta (crater), a crater on the moon, named after him,
Vieta's formulas, expressing the coefficients of a polynomial as signed sums and products of its roots.
Vieta (beetle), a genus of beetles